St Paul's Church, Truro is a Grade II listed former parish church in the Church of England Diocese of Truro and in Truro, Cornwall.

History

The church was built in 1845 at a cost of £2,840 (equivalent to £ in ). The church was paid for by William Tweedy who advanced the money interest free. It opened for worship on 23 November 1845. As the church was in debt, the bishop refused to consecrate it and it took 20 years for the congregation to clear the debt and endow the living. Finally the parish raised £1,100, to which the church commissioners added £1,000, which was invested to provide a stipend for the vicar of £66 15s 4d per annum (equivalent to £ in ).

The church was consecrated in on 26 November 1864 by the Bishop of Exeter, Henry Phillpotts, and given its own parish. By 1880 the church was insufficient in size for its growing congregation, and a committee was formed to enlarge it with the addition of a chancel, north and south aisles. The congregation employed the architect John Dando Sedding. A consecration service took place for the new chancel on 7 January 1884, which had been built by Mr. W Bone of Liskeard for £3,000 (equivalent to £ in ).

The north aisle was added in 1889 and the church reopened on 27 June 1889.
 
The tower was completed by Edmund Harold Sedding in 1910.

The church is noted for its stained glass scheme by Lavers, Barraud and Westlake.

The church closed in 2007 after significant structural problems were identified in the quinquennial survey. With an estimated repair bill of £1,000,000, the congregation decided to move to alternative premises.

Organ

The church contained an organ by Hele and Co. A specification of the organ can be found on the National Pipe Organ Register.

See also

Convent of the Epiphany

References

Truro
Truro
Churches completed in 1845
Anglo-Catholic church buildings in Cornwall